Martin Jamie Roach (born July 15, 1962) is a Canadian actor and voice actor. He is best known for his live-action roles as T. Abner Hall in the Disney XD television series Aaron Stone (2009–2010), Mike in the science-fiction television series Falling Skies (2011), Pastor Evan Miller in The Wedding Planners (2020) and Captain Gosset in the Apple TV+ television series See (2021–2022).

His voice roles on animation and video games include Jake Justice in Rescue Heroes, Dr. Claw in the 2015 computer-animated series Inspector Gadget (2015–2018), and Pastor Jerome Jeffries in the Far Cry franchise.

Career

For animation, he voiced Jake Justice in Rescue Heroes, Sparkie in the US version of Mike the Knight and Agram in Magi-Nation. From 2015 to 2018, he provided the voice of the main antagonist Dr. Claw in the compouter-animated reboot series Inspector Gadget.  Roach has also lent in the voice of Pastor Jerome Jeffries in the PlayStation 4 video game Far Cry 5.

In 2022, he played Marty in the action comedy film The Man from Toronto, starring Kevin Hart, Woody Harrelson and Kaley Cuoco.

Filmography

Film

Television

Video games

References

External links
 

1962 births
Canadian male film actors
Canadian male television actors
Canadian male voice actors
Black Canadian male actors
Canadian people of Nigerian descent
20th-century Canadian male actors
21st-century Canadian male actors
Male actors from Ontario